Quỳnh Nhai is a district (huyện) of Sơn La province in the Northwest region of Vietnam.

As of 2003 the district had a population of 62,189. The district covers an area of 1,049 km². The district capital lies at Quỳnh Nhai.

References

Districts of Sơn La province
Sơn La province